Csaba "Gabbi" Gábriš (born 3 March 1988) is a Slovak former professional football player and coach who last worked as the conditioning coach of Chennaiyin FC in the Indian Super League.

Early life and education
Born in Bratislava, Gábriš earned a doctorate in sports science from Comenius University, where he also taught for a year.

Playing career
A defender, Gábriš played for the Slovak clubs FC Senec, ŠK Blava Jaslovské Bohunice, and (in 2008–09) FC DAC 1904 Dunajská Streda, and for the Slovakia national under-21 football team.

Coaching career
While teaching at Comenius University, he began his coaching career at the FC Nitra youth academy in Slovakia. He then worked as a fitness trainer for DAC in the 2016–17 and 2017–18 seasons, then for Dundee United F.C. in Scotland as physical preparation coach and Sepsi OSK Sfântu Gheorghe in Romania as strength and conditioning coach, both with Csaba László, before returning to DAC. In 2020 he and DAC goalkeeper coach Martin Raška both accepted an offer to work for Chennaiyin FC in India, where László is head coach.

References

Living people
1988 births
Slovak footballers
Footballers from Bratislava
Association football defenders
Association football coaches
Chennaiyin FC non-playing staff
Comenius University alumni